Ottermere railway station is in the community of Ottermere in Unorganized Kenora District in northwestern Ontario, Canada. The station is on the Canadian National Railway transcontinental main line, between Malachi to the west and Wade to the east, and is used by Via Rail as a stop for transcontinental Canadian trains.

References

External links
 Ottermere railway station

Via Rail stations in Ontario
Railway stations in Kenora District
Canadian National Railway stations in Ontario